Navicula adamata is a species of algae in the genus Navicula.

References

adamata
Protists described in 2006
Ochrophyte species